Melinda Tankard Reist (born 23 September 1963) is an Australian writer, speaker, blogger and media commentator. Tankard Reist describes herself as "an advocate for women and girls" and a "pro-life feminist".

Early life
Tankard Reist was born in Mildura, Victoria. She completed secondary schooling at Mildura High School and then studied journalism at the Royal Melbourne Institute of Technology before taking up a cadetship at the Sunraysia Daily, where she worked from 1983 to 1987. As a recipient of a Rotary Foundation scholarship, she studied journalism at the California State University, Long Beach, in 1987 and 1988.

Career
On her return to Australia, Tankard Reist was a freelance contributor to newspapers and to ABC radio. From 1991 to 1993, she lived in South East Asia and was engaged in voluntary aid work, including caring for infants with disabilities relinquished for adoption. On her return to Australia, she took up a position as an advisor to independent Senator Brian Harradine from 1993 to 2005. She was on the founding committee of Karinya House for Mothers and Babies, a supported accommodation and outreach service to women pregnant without support, and Erin House transitional housing for women post-birth. She was the founding director of Women's Forum Australia which described itself as being "an independent women's think tank that undertakes research, education, and public policy development about social, economic, health, and cultural issues affecting women". She has also worked as a consultant to NGOs with a focus on global poverty, including World Vision Australia from 2005 to 2008 when she was involved in the development of the organisation's Don't Trade Lives campaign. In 2009, she co-founded Collective Shout for a World Free of Sexploitation, a grass-roots campaigning movement which targets advertisers, corporations and marketers which objectify women and sexualise girls to sell products and services.

Tankard Reist is a contributing editor of five books published by Duffy & Snellgrove and Spinifex Press, including one with Abigail Bray and another with Caroline Norma.

Writings

References

External links

Tankard Reist's articles on The Punch website

Australian anti-abortion activists
Australian bloggers
Living people
1963 births
RMIT University alumni
California State University, Long Beach alumni
Australian women bloggers
Australian feminist writers